The People's United Socialist Front was an electoral alliance in West Bengal, India, formed ahead of the 1952 West Bengal Legislative Assembly election. The front was composed of the Socialist Party, the Forward Bloc (Ruikar) and the Revolutionary Communist Party of India (Tagore).

The front had candidates in 105 out of 238 constituencies (63 SP candidates, 32 FB(R) and 10 RCPI). The front gained 4.84% of the votes, but only two of its candidates (both from Ruikar's Forward Bloc) were able to win seats.

Results
The election was won by the Indian National Congress, who got a majority of its own in the assembly. The communists became the largest opposition party.

References

Defunct political parties in West Bengal
1952 establishments in West Bengal
Political parties established in 1952